Romesh Chander Dogra was an Indian politician from the state of Punjab. He was a minister in the Punjab government and the deputy speaker of the Punjab Legislative Assembly.

Constituency
Dogra represented the Dasuya assembly constituency and was a four-term member of the Punjab Legislative Assembly from 1985 to 2007.

Political Party  
Dogra was a member of Indian National Congress.

Death
Dogra died on 23 April 2013.

References 

People from Punjab, India